1974 in professional wrestling describes the year's events in the world of professional wrestling.

List of notable promotions 
Only one promotion held notable shows in 1974.

Calendar of notable shows

Awards and honors

Pro Wrestling Illustrated

Championship changes

EMLL

NWA

Births
Date of birth uncertain:
Hiroko Suzuki
 January 4 – Dark Cuervo
 January 5 - Yutaka Yoshie
 February 19 – Danny Doring 
 March 1 – Brandi Alexander 
 March 4 – Crowbar
 March 11 - Jonny Fairplay 
 March 14 - Santino Marella 
 March 27 – Russ Haas (d. 2001)
 April 6 – Flash Flanagan
 April 9 – Jenna Jameson 
 April 14 - Toshie Uematsu
 April 21 – Orlando Jordan
 April 24 – Octagoncito
 April 27 - Johnny Devine 
 May 11 – Billy Kidman
 May 21 - Josef Samael 
 June 6 – 2 Tuff Tony
 June 22 - Amber O'Neal 
 June 26 – Matt Striker 
 June 27 – Ace Darling
 July 6: 
 Harashima
 Black Buffalo (wrestler)
 July 12 – Gregory Helms
 July 13 – Konan Big
 July 16 – Chris Chetti 
 July 19 – Rey Bucanero 
 July 19 – Jeremy Borash
 July 23 – Sonny Siaki 
 July 25 :
Kenzo Suzuki 
Mikael Judas 
 August 5 – Rob Black
 August 8 – Scott D'Amore
 August 22 - Brimstone 
 September 5 – Derick Neikirk 
 September 8 - Rick Michaels 
 September 9 – Jun Kasai 
 September 18 – Reckless Youth 
 September 20 - Robbie McAllister 
 September 23 – Matt Hardy
 September 24:
Carl Leduc
Dru Onyx 
 September 30 – Eli Cottonwood
 October 8 – H. C. Loc 
 October 14 – Shaggy 2 Dope 
 October 17 – Cincinnati Red (died in 2015) 
 October 31 - Jungle Grrrl
 November 16:
John Cone
Starman (died in 2022) 
 November 28 – Rob Conway
 November 30 – Juventud Guerrera
 December 6 - Kentaro Shiga 
 December 11 – Rey Mysterio
 December 12 – Chad Collyer
 December 31 – Tzuki

Debuts
 Uncertain debut date
 Adrian Adonis
 Jake Roberts 
 Jesse Ventura
 Jerry Blackwell
 Tommy Rich
 Dave Finlay
 Lanny Poffo
 April 8 - Antonio Peña
 July 10 - Tony Atlas 
 August 6 - Vivian St. John

Retirements
 Fred Atkins (? – 1974)
 Dave Ruhl (1946 – 1974)
 Bearcat Wright (1959 – 1974)

Deaths
 January 25 - Joe Savoldi, 65 
 March 13 - Gene Dubuque, 46
 March 29 - Joe Stecher, 80 
 April 2 - Lee Wykoff, 76
 May 31 - Sky Hi Lee, 53 
 June 24 – Mangla Rai, 60
 July 26 – Freddie Sweetan, 36
 August 21 – Buford Pusser, 37
 September 13 - Jack Pfefer, 79
 September 18 - Ray Richards, 68
 October 29 - Axel Cadier, 68

References

 
professional wrestling